South Reddish is the southern part of Reddish, in Stockport, Greater Manchester.

South Reddish or Reddish South can refer to:

 A loosely defined geographical area covering the southern part of Reddish;
 A precisely defined ward named Reddish South that elects three Councillors to Stockport Metropolitan Borough Council; or
 A disused railway station in Reddish renowned for only having one service a week.

Geography of the Metropolitan Borough of Stockport
Areas of Greater Manchester